Kargalı (literally "(place) with crows") is a Turkish place name that may refer to the following places in Turkey:

 Kargalı, Besni, a village in the district of Besni, Adıyaman Province
 Kargalı, Polatlı, a village in the district of Polatlı, Ankara Province

See also
 Kargalik (disambiguation)
 Kargili (disambiguation)